Élora Pattaro (born 16 February 1986) is a Brazilian fencer. She competed in the women's individual sabre event at the 2004 Summer Olympics, one year after getting a silver medal at the World Championships Cadets/Juniors, losing only to Olena Khomrova, the best ever result for a Brazilian fencer in the FIE World Championships.

References

External links
FIE Profile
Results

1986 births
Living people
Brazilian female sabre fencers
Olympic fencers of Brazil
Fencers at the 2003 Pan American Games
Fencers at the 2011 Pan American Games
Fencers at the 2004 Summer Olympics
Sportspeople from São Paulo
Pan American Games competitors for Brazil
21st-century Brazilian women